This list of historical British telcos is a list of telecommunications companies that either existed prior to British Telecom's (BT) privatisation, or, if created subsequently to BT's privatisation, took over telecoms networks that existed prior to the privatisation.

BT and predecessors
These are the early British telecommunications companies that were nationalised by the British government, the nationalised government organisations that succeeded them, and the privatisation entity that in turn succeeded those.

Telegraph companies
Between 1846 and 1868, that is, from the formation of the first company until the announcement of nationalisation, 64 telegraph companies were formed.  However, 68% of them failed, and only a handful of them grew to any significant size.

Anglo-American Telegraph Company
Bonelli's Electric Telegraph Company
British and Irish Magnetic Telegraph Company
British Electric Telegraph Company
British Telegraph Company
Eastern Telegraph Company
Electric and International Telegraph Company
Electric Telegraph Company
English and Irish Magnetic Telegraph Company
International Telegraph Company
Irish Submarine Telegraph Company
London District Telegraph Company
Submarine Telegraph Company
United Kingdom Telegraph Company
Universal Private Telegraph Company

Telephone companies

Corporation of Glasgow Telephone Department
Edison Telephone Company of London Limited
Lancashire and Cheshire Telephonic Exchange Company Limited
London and Globe Telephone Maintenance Company
National Telephone Company
Northern District Telephone Company
Telephone Company Limited (Bell's Patents)
United Telephone Company
Western Counties and South Wales Telephone Company

Nationalised successors

General Post Office
Post Office Telecommunications 
Post Office Corporation (Telecommunications division)
British Telecom

Post-privatisation
British Telecommunications plc

Early BT competitors

British Rail Telecommunications
Cable and Wireless
Energis
Kingston Communications
Mercury Telecommunications
NTL
Racal Telecom
Vodafone

See also

BT Archives
BT Museum
Connected Earth

References

External links
Distant Writing - The History of the Telegraph Companies in Britain between 1838 and 1868
https://web.Archive.org/web/20100527143141/http://www.BTplc.com/Thegroup/BTsHistory/History.htm

Telcos